CJJM-FM is a Canadian radio station, broadcasting at 99.3 FM in Espanola, Ontario. The station currently airs an adult contemporary format and is branded on-air as 99.3 Moose FM. The station is owned by Vista Radio.

History
Originally owned by Joco Communications, the station was licensed by the CRTC on July 19, 2007.

CJJM began testing at 99.3 FM in late 2007 and officially began broadcasting in spring 2008. The station offered an adult contemporary/classic hits format with some specialty programming, similar to the format of Joco's CFSF-FM in Sturgeon Falls. However, unlike CFSF's bilingual format, CJJM broadcasts exclusively in English.

In May 2010, an application by Haliburton Broadcasting Group to acquire the station was received by the CRTC. This application was approved on August 12 of that year. Formerly branded as Joco Radio, the station was rebranded to 99.3 Moose FM in September 2010 with an adult hits format including some current hits. Joco subsequently sold CFSF-FM to Haliburton to a separate transaction in late 2010.

On April 23, 2012 Vista Broadcast Group, which owns a number of radio stations in western Canada, announced a deal to acquire Haliburton Broadcasting, in cooperation with Westerkirk Capital. The transaction was approved by the CRTC on October 19, 2012.

References

External links

 

Jjm
Jjm
Espanola, Ontario
Jjm
Radio stations established in 2008
2008 establishments in Ontario